Ben Lukas Boysen, also known by his stage name Hecq, is an electronic music composer based in Berlin.

Biography
Boysen studied classical guitar and piano as a child. He moved to Berlin in the early 2000s, setting up a studio called Hecq Audio, and composed electronic music under the alias Hecq from 2003. As Hecq, he released music in a variety of electronic styles, including glitch, ambient, breakcore, abstract IDM, and dubstep, mostly on the label Hymen Records.

In 2014, his piece "Sleepers Beat Theme" was featured as the opening track of Jon Hopkins's LateNightTales compilation CD. He signed with Erased Tapes in 2016 and has released three solo full-length albums to date as Ben Lukas Boysen. The first, Gravity, was originally issued in 2013, but was reissued by Erased Tapes in 2016; the second album, Spells, was released in 2016 as well. In 2017 Boysen’s video game score in collaboration with Sebastian Plano, Everything, was released; while 2020 saw the release of his third solo album Mirage.

Boysen also does soundtrack work and has written pieces for entities such as Marvel and Amnesty International.

Discography

As Hecq

Albums
A Dried Youth (Kaleidoskop, 2003)
Scatterheart (Hymen Records, 2004)
Bad Karma (Hymen Records, 2005)
0000 (Hymen Records, 2007)
Night Falls (Hymen Records, 2008)
Steeltongued (Hymen Records, 2009)
Avenger (Hymen Records, 2011)
Horror Vacui (Hymen Records, 2013)
Conversions (Ad Noiseam, 2014)
Mare Nostrum (Hymen Records, 2015)
Chansons de Geste (Hymen Records, 2017)

Singles and EPs
Zetha (onpa))))), 2007)
Golden Pines (Binkcrsh, 2008)
Sura (Ad Noiseam, 2010)
Spheres of Fury (with Exillon, Contortion, 2011)
Enceladus (Ad Noiseam, 2012)
Pain Call (with Skyence, Edged Music, 2013)

As Ben Lukas Boysen

Albums
Infinite Rounds (Grundruck, 2007)
Gravity (Ad Noiseam, 2013)
Spells (Erased Tapes, 2016)
Everything (with Sebastian Plano, Erased Tapes, 2017)
Mirage (Erased Tapes, 2020)

Singles and EPs 

 Thesis 16 (with Martin Heyne, Thesis, 2020)

Soundtracks
Restive (2012)
Mother Nature (2013)
Sleeper's Beat (2014)
Sundays (2015)
The Collini Case (2019)
Siren Songs (2021)

References

German electronic musicians
1981 births
Living people
Erased Tapes Records artists